The Russian Championship (sometimes referred to as the Russian Super League or the Championship of Russia) is the major rugby league tournament for clubs in Russia.  Currently six teams from across Russia compete in this competition.  The league is governed by the Russian Rugby League.

It was established in 1991 to form a national rugby league competition from the many amateur and semi-professional leagues in Moscow, Kazan and other districts of Russia. An attempt was made to organize and register a national competition during the USSR era, but permission was denied on the basis of the professional status of the game. The Russia national rugby league team (with the exception of limited foreign players such as former captain Ian Rubin) is largely made up of players drawn from the Russian Championship.

2022 Teams

See also

 Rugby league in Russia
 Russia national rugby league team
 Russian Championship XVII

External links 
 Results of the 2006 Season
 Google-Video
 http://rugby13.org.ua/index.php?option=com_content&view=category&layout=blog&id=9&Itemid=11 Legion's official site, includes an up-to-date table (in Russian)

Rugby league in Russia
Recurring sporting events established in 1991
European rugby league competitions
National championships in Russia